Iloilo-Negros Air Express Aviation Corporation, which operated as INAEC Aviation Corporation or INAEC, is an airline company based in the Philippines. Founded in 1932 by the López family of Iloilo as Iloilo-Negros Air Express Company, Inc. (operated as Iloilo-Negros Air Express or simply INAEC), it was the first commercial airline in the Philippines. It was later renamed Far Eastern Air Transport Inc. (FEATI) and folded into the operations of Philippine Airlines (PAL) which was re-nationalized by the Philippine government and became the national flag carrier. The company built the Bacolod International Airport in Bacolod City, which was bought by PAL after the acquisition of the airline. INAEC was resurrected in 1993 as INAEC Aviation Corporation to serve the aviation needs of the Lopez Group of Companies and as a charter airline in 2001.

History
The history of commercial aviation in the Philippines started in 1925. The first regular air services were launched in Iloilo (Western Visayas), said to be the birthplace of Filipino commercial air transportation. Jose Tinsay, an Ilonggo aviator, was the first to fly the 43-kilometer Guimaraes Strait between Iloilo and Bacolod.

Founded in 1932 by López family of Iloilo, it became Asia's first commercial airline based in Iloilo and Manila that served domestic routes to Bacolod, Baguio, Cebu, Davao, Del Monte and Manila. The airline company was converted after World War II to Far Eastern Air Transport Inc. (FEATI). It was the first Filipino airline to go regional and internationally offering routes to Hong Kong, Bangkok, San Francisco, Shanghai, and India.

In 1932, Don Eugenio H. López, Sr., the sugar and shipping magnate, launched Iloilo-Negros Air Express Company (INAEC) which became the first Filipino-owned private airline in the Philippines with its operational base in Iloilo. INAEC’s first aircraft, a Stinson Tri-Motor, had its inaugural flight on February 1, 1933, from Iloilo to Manila. Regular air services between Manila, Bacolod, Iloilo and Cebu started within a year, and then expanded to Zamboanga and Davao in another two years. INAEC with its three-engine aircraft advertised its air travel as “fast, commodious, elegant and reliant” compared with the other services.

Despite the great depression in the US and Europe, aviation in the Philippines still boomed at that time with 60 airfields scattered all over the country, four of which were in Manila. INAEC then used Grace Park (airfields were then called “parks”) located near the Bonifacio Monument.

From 1935 to April 1937, the Air Corps had arrangements with INAEC and the US Army Air Corps in Nichols Field for enlisted men to work as apprentices in their shops. Many Air Corps maintenance men had their hands-on training at INAEC.

Also in 1937, INAEC purchased its seaplane, a Sikorsky S-43 amphibian, the most modern aircraft at that time, which carried 16 passengers. Another feat for INAEC is the introduction of steward service which was the first in the Philippines. INAEC was so successful that, by the end of the decade, it was flying 2,000 passengers a month. In 1941, it began flying to Baguio. The entire INAEC fleet was however destroyed in World War II.

But quickly after the war, the López brothers restarted operations of INAEC. The company was renamed Far East Asia Transport, Inc. (FEATI), with an inaugural flight on November 19, 1945, from Grace Park in Caloocan to Iloilo. Immediately the airline set up a wide network of domestic routes. In May 1946, it flew to Hong Kong and Bangkok, making it the first Filipino airline to go regional. Later, with flights to San Francisco, Shanghai, and India, it became the country’s first international airline service.

Merger with Philippine Airlines 
A combination of political and business developments in 1947 eventually forced the López brothers to sell FEATI, which was merged by its new owner with Philippine Airlines.

Destinations
Past Routes

(Domestic)

Bacolod
Baguio
Cebu
Davao
Del Monte
Iloilo
Manila (Grace Park)

(International)

Hong Kong
Bangkok
Delhi or Mumbai
San Francisco
Shanghai

Revival
In 1993, the López Group of Companies revived INAEC to support its own air transportation requirements.

On November 9, 1993, the INAEC name was revived to service the air transportation needs of the López Group. 

On December 19, 2001, INAEC obtained its Certificate of Public Convenience and Necessity (CPCN) and immediately thereafter went into domestic and international chartering and non-scheduled air services. Prior to such event, there were plans to revive the airline by the López Group which was disclosed by the Mayor of Iloilo City, Jed Patrick Mabilog, who had met with López Group executives.

References

Companies based in Iloilo City
Defunct airlines of the Philippines
Airlines of the Philippines
Airlines established in 1932
Lopez Group of Companies